Pierre Kunc (28 October 1865 – 29 December 1941) was a French composer and organist.

Life 
After literary studies in his hometown, Kunc entered the École Niedermeyer de Paris in 1889. There he studied organ with Clément Loret and piano with Charles Wilfrid de Bériot and was awarded organ, harmony, fugue and composition prizes. In the fall of 1890, he continued his training at the Conservatoire de Paris in the classes of Eugène Gigout (organ) and Ernest Guiraud (composition).

Work 
 12 Pièces sur des noëls français for pipe organ
 Prélude grave « à la manière de Hændel » in J. Joubert, Maîtres contemporains de l'orgue, vol. 1, Paris (1912)
 Offertoire en fa majeur, Offertoire sur deux noëls in B flat major, Marche pour Sortie in D major, for organ or harmonium, in Parnasse des organistes du XXe siècle, Arras (1911)
 Symphonie pyrénéenne for orchestra (1911)
 Sonate pour alto et piano (or orchestra) (1919-21)
 Symphonie en ré mineur for organ (1921-1923)
 Vingt Prières de l’orgue (1925)
 Messe en l’honneur de Sainte Bernadette Soubirous for 4-part mixed choir and organ (1935)
 Messe Solennelle en l’honneur des Saintes Reliques for mixed choir and organ (1925-1938)
 Rapsodie pour alto et piano, Fêtes - Recueillement - Danses (1939)

Further reading 
François Pellecer: Pierre Kunc. Compositeur. 1865–1941. F. Pellecer, 2001.

External links 

An article about Kunc's 150th anniversary, with enhanced biographical background
Diapason

References 

20th-century French composers
1865 births
Musicians from Toulouse
Conservatoire de Paris alumni
French classical organists
1941 deaths